Jake Kolodjashnij ("collar-JAZZ-knee"; born 9 August 1995) is a professional Australian rules footballer, currently playing for the Geelong Football Club in the Australian Football League.

Early life
Kolodjashnij grew up in Tasmania where he played soccer and basketball in his younger years. His grandparents fled the Soviet controlled Ukraine after World War II and settled in Australia. Kolodjashnij's twin brother Kade also played football professionally, first playing for the Gold Coast Suns, and then the Melbourne Football Club before retiring in 2020 due to concussion issues.

He attended St Patrick's College, Launceston.

Kolodjashnij began playing Australian football for the first time at 12 years of age for the Prospect Junior Football Club. Kolodjashnij lived across the road from Prospect Park, a multi-use venue for both soccer and Australian football.  He and brother Kade played in junior premierships for Prospect in under-13s and under-14s of the Northern Tasmanian Junior Football Association.  In his under-15 season with Prospect he and Kade were referred to Tasmanian head coach, and former AFL player, Matthew Armstrong, for consideration for the Tasmanian talented player pathway and were recognised as having significant potential.  As part of the talented player pathway process, both the Kolodjashnij brothers were permitted to Tasmanian State League club, Launceston, for their under-16 year. Jake played for Tasmania in the under-16 National Championship in 2011 and followed that with selection in the under-18 National Championships in both 2012 and 2013. He was taken with the 41st pick in the 2013 AFL draft by the Geelong Football Club.

AFL career
Kolodjashnij is a tall defender who has shown good athleticism and football smarts since taken with Geelong’s third selection in the 2013 NAB AFL Draft. Kolodjashnij reads the play well and comes off his opponent at the right times to win the ball in the air. An effective rebounding player who is a strong overhead mark and possesses neat foot skills, he produced encouraging performances in 16 VFL games last year and finished fourth in the Cats’ Victorian Football League best and fairest. He had to wait until round 12 of the 2015 season to make his AFL debut against Melbourne.

Personal life
Kolodjashnij currently studies a Bachelor of Commerce at Deakin University.

Statistics
Updated to the end of the 2022 season.

|-
| 2015 ||  || 8
| 9 || 0 || 1 || 58 || 68 || 126 || 34 || 25 || 0.0 || 0.1 || 6.4 || 7.6 || 14.0 || 3.8 || 2.8
|-
| 2016 ||  || 8
| 20 || 0 || 0 || 126 || 106 || 232 || 75 || 48 || 0.0 || 0.0 || 6.3 || 5.3 || 11.6 || 3.8 || 2.4
|-
| 2017 ||  || 8
| 18 || 0 || 3 || 132 || 131 || 263 || 79 || 43 || 0.0 || 0.2 || 7.3 || 7.3 || 14.6 || 4.4 || 2.4
|-
| 2018 ||  || 8
| 23 || 0 || 2 || 154 || 136 || 290 || 95 || 42 || 0.0 || 0.1 || 6.7 || 5.9 || 12.6 || 4.1 || 1.8
|-
| 2019 ||  || 8
| 23 || 0 || 1 || 167 || 86 || 253 || 109 || 33 || 0.0 || 0.0 || 7.3 || 3.7 || 11.0 || 4.7 || 1.4
|-
| 2020 ||  || 8
| 17 || 0 || 3 || 125 || 52 || 177 || 77 || 25 || 0.0 || 0.2 || 7.4 || 3.1 || 10.4 || 4.5 || 1.5
|-
| 2021 ||  || 8
| 22 || 1 || 0 || 165 || 104 || 269 || 120 || 27 || 0.0 || 0.0 || 7.5 || 4.7 || 12.2 || 5.5 || 1.2
|-
| scope=row bgcolor=F0E68C | 2022# ||  || 8
| 23 || 2 || 0 || 165 || 111 || 276 || 107 || 33 || 0.1 || 0.0 || 7.2 || 4.8 || 12.0 || 4.7 || 1.4
|- class=sortbottom
! colspan=3 | Career
! 155 !! 3 !! 10 !! 1092 !! 794 !! 1886 !! 696 !! 276 !! 0.0 !! 0.1 !! 7.0 !! 5.1 !! 12.2 !! 4.5 !! 1.8
|}

Notes

Honours and achievements
Team
 AFL premiership player: 2022
 2× McClelland Trophy: 2019, 2022

Individual
 Geelong F.C. Best Young Player Award: 2016

References

External links

Living people
1995 births
Geelong Football Club players
Geelong Football Club Premiership players
Launceston Football Club players
Australian rules footballers from Tasmania
Australian people of Ukrainian descent
Twin sportspeople
One-time VFL/AFL Premiership players